Mauritius competed in the Olympic Games for the first time at the 1984 Summer Olympics in Los Angeles, United States.

Results by event

Athletics
Men's 100 metres
Daniel André
 Heat — 11.19 (→ did not advance)

Men's 200 metres
Daniel André
 Heat — 22.16 (→ did not advance)

Men's 400 metres
Daniel André
 Heat — 49.09 (→ did not advance)

Men's Decathlon 
 Vivian Coralie 
 Final Result — 6084 points (→ 25th place)

Men's Discus Throw 
 Dominique Bechard 
 Qualification — 41.10 (→ did not advance, 18th place)

Men's Hammer Throw 
 Dominique Bechard 
 Qualification — no mark (→ did not advance, no ranking)

Women's Discus Throw 
 Christine Béchard 
 Qualification — 37.94m (→ did not advance, 17th place)

References
sports-reference
Official Olympic Reports

Nations at the 1984 Summer Olympics
1984
Oly